John Dolben (1625–1686) was an English priest and Church of England bishop and archbishop.

Life

Early life

He was the son of William Dolben (died 1631), prebendary of Lincoln and bishop-designate of Gloucester, and Elizabeth Williams, niece of John Williams, Archbishop of York. The leading judge Sir William Dolben was his brother.

He was educated at Westminster School under Richard Busby and at Christ Church, Oxford. He fought on the Royalist side at the Battle of Marston Moor, in 1644, and in the defence of York, and was wounded twice. By 1646, like most of the Royalists, he had abandoned all hope of victory and resumed his studies.

Subsequently, he took orders and maintained in private the proscribed Anglican service; during these years he lived at St Aldates, Oxford, home of his wife's father Ralph Sheldon, brother of the future Archbishop Sheldon.

Bishop

At the Restoration, he became canon of Christ Church (1660) and prebendary of St Paul's, London (1661), no doubt partly due to the influence of Sheldon, now Bishop of London. As Dean of Westminster (1662–1683), he opposed an attempt to bring the abbey under diocesan rule. His charm, eloquence, generosity and frankness gained him enormous popularity. In 1664 he was appointed Clerk of the Closet (until 1668) and in 1666 was made Bishop of Rochester. The fall of his friend Edward Hyde, 1st Earl of Clarendon the next year is said to have caused him to be in temporary disgrace, but he was quickly restored to favour. In 1675 he was appointed Lord High Almoner and in 1683 he was made Archbishop of York; he distinguished himself by reforming the discipline of the cathedrals in these dioceses. He was the first president of the Corporation of the Sons of the Clergy when it received its Royal Charter in 1678.

Death and family
At Easter 1686, returning to York from London, he came into contact with a smallpox victim, caught the infection and died a few days later. His last months are said to have been greatly troubled by King James II's attempts to re-establish the Roman Catholic faith.

He married Catherine Sheldon, a niece of Gilbert Sheldon, Archbishop of Canterbury; her father was Ralph Sheldon of Stanton, Staffordshire. He had two sons, Gilbert, judge of the Court of Common Pleas (Ireland) and first of the Dolben baronets, and John Dolben, a well-known politician. A daughter named Catherine died in infancy. From a letter Gilbert wrote in 1691 it seems that the Archbishop was much troubled in his last years by John's profligate behaviour: he was a confirmed gambler who went through all his money, and then lost the fortune he had gained by marriage to the heiress Elizabeth Mulso. His uncle the judge disinherited him, and by 1691 his wife and children were living on the charity of friends. According to Gilbert, his father's enemies happily seized on this family tragedy as evidence that the Archbishop was a bad or neglectful parent.

The Archbishop Dolben cup presented at the York International 9s rugby league festival is named after John Dolben.

In literature

John Dryden, in Absalom and Achitophel, gave a portrait of Dolben: "Him of the Western dome, whose weighty senseFlows in fit words and heavenly eloquence."

References

1625 births
1686 deaths
People educated at Westminster School, London
Alumni of Christ Church, Oxford
Cavaliers
Bishops of Rochester
Deans of Westminster
17th-century Anglican archbishops
Archbishops of York
Fellows of the Royal Society
Clerks of the Closet
17th-century Church of England bishops